Rahmatabad may refer to the following villages and towns. All are located in Iran.

Castle 

 Rahmatabad castle, a castle in Yazd Province

Fars Province
Rahmatabad, Arsanjan, a village in Arsanjan County
Rahmatabad, Eqlid, a village in Eqlid County
Rahmatabad, Fasa, a village in Fasa County
Rahmatabad, Jahrom, a village in Jahrom County
Rahmatabad, Pasargad, a village in Pasargad County
Rahmatabad, Shiraz, a village in Shiraz County
Rahmatabad Mound
Rahmatabad Rural District (Fars Province), in Shiraz County

Gilan Province
Rahmatabad Rural District (Gilan Province)

Golestan Province
Rahmatabad, Golestan

Isfahan Province
Rahmatabad, Ardestan, a village in Ardestan County
Rahmatabad, Zavareh, a village in Ardestan County
Rahmatabad, Khvansar, a village in Khvansar County
Rahmatabad, Lenjan, a village in Lenjan County
Rahmatabad, Najafabad, a village in Najafabad County
Rahmatabad, Natanz, a village in Natanz County
Rahmatabad, Tiran and Karvan, a village in Tiran and Karvan County

Kerman Province
Rahmatabad, Anbarabad, a village in Anbarabad County
Rahmatabad, Arzuiyeh, a village in Arzuiyeh County
Rahmatabad, Baft, a village in Baft County
Rahmatabad, Fahraj, a village in Fahraj County
Rahmatabad, Rafsanjan, a village in Rafsanjan County
Rahmatabad, Koshkuiyeh, a village in Rafsanjan County
Rahmatabad, Rigan, a village in Rigan County
Rahmatabad-e Kataki, a village in Rudbar-e Jonubi County
Rahmatabad-e Mian Deran, a village in Rudbar-e Jonubi County
Rahmatabad-e Salehiha, a village in Sirjan County
Rahmatabad, Zarand, a village in Zarand County

Kermanshah Province
Rahmatabad, Kangavar, a village in Kangavar County
Rahmatabad, Kermanshah, a village in Kermanshah County

Kurdistan Province
Rahmatabad, Kurdistan, a village in Bijar County

Lorestan Province
Rahmatabad, Pol-e Dokhtar
Rahmatabad, Selseleh

Markazi Province
Rahmatabad, Markazi

North Khorasan Province
Rahmatabad, North Khorasan

Qazvin Province
 Rahmatabad-e Bozorg
 Rahmatabad-e Kuchak

Qom Province
Rahmatabad, Qom

Razavi Khorasan Province
Rahmatabad, Gonabad, a village in Gonabad County
Rahmatabad, Jowayin, a village in Jowayin County
Rahmatabad, Nishapur, a village in Nishapur County
Rahmatabad, Sarakhs, a village in Sarakhs County
Rahmatabad, Torbat-e Jam, a village in Torbat-e Jam County
Rahmatabad, Zaveh, a village in Zaveh County

Sistan and Baluchestan Province
Rahmatabad, Chabahar, a village in Chabahar County
Rahmatabad, Eskelabad, a village in Khash County
Rahmatabad, Qasr-e Qand, a village in Qasr-e Qand County

South Khorasan Province
Rahmatabad, Ferdows, a village in Ferdows County
Rahmatabad, Tabas, a village in Tabas County

Yazd Province
Rahmatabad, Abarkuh, a village in Abarkuh County
Rahmatabad, Aqda, a village in Ardakan County
Rahmatabad, Khatam, a village in Khatam County

Zanjan Province
Rahmatabad, Khodabandeh, a village in Khodabandeh County
Rahmatabad, Khorramdarreh, a village in Khorramdarreh County